Tim Cahill is an Australian former professional footballer who played as a midfielder or forward for the Australia national soccer team (nicknamed the "Socceroos") from 2004 to 2018. During his international career, he scored 50 goals in 108 appearances for the side, making him the nation's all-time record goalscorer. He played his final game for Australia at the 2018 FIFA World Cup against Peru, and announced his retirement following the end of the tournament. Cahill was well known for his trademark goal celebration, in which he ran to the corner of the pitch and shadowboxed the corner flag. 

Cahill made his debut for Australia in a friendly against South Africa in March 2004. He scored his first two goals for the side in a win over Tahiti at the 2004 OFC Nations Cup. In the next game of the tournament, he scored his first international hat-trick against Fiji. His 12th international goal, and Australia's first in an Asian Cup, was against Oman on 8 July at the 2007 AFC Asian Cup. His 29th international goal against Costa Rica on 19 November 2013 equalled fellow Australian Damian Mori's record, which he surpassed on 5 March 2014 with two goals in a friendly against Ecuador. During a 4–0 win over Bangladesh on 17 November 2015 in a 2018 World Cup second round qualifier, he scored the first three goals of the match, marking his second and final international hat-trick. Excluding those two hat-tricks, Cahill scored twice in an international match on ten occasions. 

During his international career, Cahill scored five goals against AFC rivals Japan, more than he scored against any other country. Two of these goals were at the 2006 World Cup, which were also the first goals scored by Australia at any World Cup. He also scored against Serbia at the 2010 World Cup and against both Chile and the Netherlands at the 2014 World Cup. His volleyed goal against the Netherlands was subsequently nominated for the 2014 FIFA Puskás Award, an award given to the player who scored the "most beautiful" goal of the calendar year.

On 10 October 2017, Cahill scored both goals in a 2–1 win over Syria during a 2018 World Cup fourth round qualifier. The second of these was Cahill's 50th and final international goal, making him the 59th man to score 50 international goals. During his career, Cahill scored six goals at three Asian Cups (2007, 2011, 2015) and six goals at one OFC Nations Cup (2004). Thirteen of Cahill's 50 international goals were scored in friendlies, all of them against nations from each of the six confederations.

Goals
Scores and results list Australia's goal tally first, score column indicates score after each Cahill goal.

Statistics

See also
 List of men's footballers with 50 or more international goals
 List of top international men's association football goal scorers by country
 List of Australia national soccer team hat-tricks

References

Australia national soccer team records and statistics
Cahill, Tim